KMZG-LP (96.1 FM) was a radio station licensed to Durango, Colorado, U.S., and serving the Four Corners area. The station was owned by Calvary Chapel of Durango, Inc. Its license was cancelled April 2, 2021, as its owners did not renew the station's license.

References

MZG-LP
La Plata County, Colorado
MZG-LP
Radio stations established in 2005
2005 establishments in Colorado
Durango, Colorado
Radio stations disestablished in 2021
MZG-LP
2021 disestablishments in Colorado
Defunct religious radio stations in the United States
Defunct radio stations in the United States